Rugby boys are a collective term for gangs of street children found in the Philippines. They are one of the most well-known poverty-afflicted people found in the slums of the Philippines. They are known for using and being addicted to a contact cement known as "Rugby" brand manufactured by Bostik and other aromatic solvents to alleviate their hunger, and resulting in crime to fund their addiction.

Data from the Philippine Department of Social Welfare and Development show that the number of street children increased by 6,365 yearly, and half of the country’s street children, from 8 to 20 years old, have at one time sniffed Rugby and other inhalants. The relative ease of procuring these substances due to their low cost contributes to widespread abuse. There is no comprehensive epidemiologic data on the magnitude of inhalant abuse among children and adolescents in the Philippines.

In response to widespread abuse of toluene-based substances, stricter rules have been imposed on the manufacture and sale of Rugby and similar glues by the Philippine Drug Enforcement Agency, such as the mandatory addition of mustard oil as a sniffing deterrent. In addition, purchasers will now be required to present valid identification for them to have access to contact cement that doesn't contain any bitterants or other such deterrents.

History
In terms of addiction, inhalants are ordinary household products such as cleaners, cooking sprays, fabric protectors, paint thinner, and adhesives and solvents. Because of the low cost of Rugby and other inhalants, poor people (especially inexperienced and destitute youths) use them to relieve hunger pangs and common poverty health problems. “Rugby Boys” (also called “Solvent Boys”) and even girls do the sniffing in the streets. The chemical is placed in a plastic bag and inhaled from the bag to achieve euphoria.

The impoverished population is the most common victim of addiction to dangerous and illegal substances. Once they are "high" they forget their hunger. Others become addicted because of family problems, poor self-esteem, and peer pressure. Solvents, particularly Rugby, is the inhalant of choice in the Philippines for most teenagers since it is easily obtained. Less scrupulous store owners sell the adhesive in small portions to children and teenagers.

Health problems
Inhalants cause nausea, blurred vision, memory lapse, and loss of motor coordination. These effects may be a minor discomfort to the user after inhalation, but permanent damage from inhalants is irreversible. Damage to organs such as the liver, kidneys, brain, and heart could be fatal.

A documentary by Karen Davila showed the effects of inhalant abuse on a person's body. One male teenager who served as the subject of the documentary has been addicted to Rugby for five years. He started sniffing Rugby due to peer influence. His parents knew about his addiction, but as his mother explained, they were unable to dissuade him from inhaling the toxic substance. His father resorted to beatings to teach him a lesson, to no avail. All his friends are addicts and the money they earn is saved to buy Rugby. The boy even turned his addiction into business, buying a bottle of Rugby then selling it in small portions to friends, and the profit enabled him to buy more Rugby.

In the months they have observed this boy, they captured him at his lowest point. With the years of abuse that his body suffered, he could not stand or walk properly, and his body was scrawny. When he was taken for a medical exam, doctors found that he had tuberculosis and that his liver and kidneys were not functioning well. Through CT Scan, it was found that his brain was smaller than average for his age bracket. Doctors said that if he continues his habit, he would either fall into a vegetative state, in a coma, or die.

The chemical toluene provides the aromatic smell of contact cement and other glue and is the culprit behind the addiction. Toluene abusers are exposed to levels above 1000 ppm (parts per million). Levels of exposure greater than 600 ppm cause confusion and delirium. Inhalant abuse causes permanent damage to the brain and may result in “sudden sniffing death”. It can also cause loss of memory, confusion or disorientation, distorted perception of time and distance, hallucinations, nausea, and emesis. Inhalant abuse leads to muscle cramps and weakness, numbness of limbs, abdominal pains, damage to the central nervous system, kidneys and liver. It also produces psychological dependence. Once the habit is formed, the dose must be increased gradually to produce the same effect.

Crimes attributed
Many Rugby boys have resorted to crime to fund their addiction. These crimes include robbery, aggressive threats and hold-ups, drug trafficking, and racketeering, and small organized crimes. In a recent television documentary by Karen Davila, a Filipino broadcaster, a boy they ordered to buy Rugby from a store easily purchased a bottle of Rugby, and was told by the store owner that the Rugby should be wrapped in paper to conceal it. This is because there is a law prohibiting the selling of solvents to minors without parental consent. Many crime syndicates and common businessmen recruit and teach children how to get away with buying it.

Many of their crimes occur in crowded public places when the police are distracted.

See also
 Street children in the Philippines

References

Street gangs
Street children
Crime in the Philippines
Poverty in the Philippines
Child welfare
Juvenile delinquency
Gangs in the Philippines